The Human Tissue Authority (HTA) is an executive non-departmental public body of the Department of Health and Social Care in the United Kingdom.  It regulates the removal, storage, use and disposal of human bodies, organs and tissue for a number of scheduled purposes such as research, transplantation, and education and training.

It was created by the Human Tissue Act 2004 and came into being on 1 April 2005 and its statutory functions began on 1 April 2006. The Board was originally chaired by Baroness Hayman followed, in 2006, by Shirley Harrison, from January 2010 to 2018 by Baroness Diana Warwick, from March 2018 to January 2019 by Baroness Nicola Blackwood and since November 2019 by Lynne Berry OBE.

The HTA's aim is to build on the confidence people have in its regulation by ensuring that human tissue and organs are used safely and ethically, and with proper consent.

It also acts as the UK competent authority under the EU Tissue and Cells Directives and the EU Organ Donation Directive.

The Human Tissue Act

The Human Tissue Act 2004 repeals and replaces the Human Tissue Act 1961, the Anatomy Act 1984 and the Human Organ Transplants Act 1989 as they relate to England and Wales, and the corresponding Orders in Northern Ireland. The ULTRA (UK agency) and the post of HM Inspector of Anatomy were abolished and their functions transferred to the Authority.

The Act makes consent the fundamental principle underpinning the lawful storage and use of body parts, organs and tissue from the living or the deceased for specified health-related purposes and public display. It also covers the removal of such material from the deceased. It lists the purposes for which consent is required (the scheduled purposes).

The Act notably prohibited private individuals from covertly collecting biological samples, such as hair and fingernails, for DNA analysis, but excluded medical and criminal investigations from the offence.

Jurisdiction and composition 
The act governs England, Wales and Northern Ireland. There is separate legislation in Scotland, the Human Tissue (Scotland) Act 2006 and the authority performs certain tasks on behalf of the Scottish Government (approval of living donation and licensing of establishments storing tissue for human application).

The Board consists of a chair and twelve members. Ten members are appointed by the Secretary of State for Health, one appointed by the Welsh Government, and one member is appointed by the Department of Health, Social Services and Public Safety in Northern Ireland.

The professional members of the board come from medical and scientific backgrounds, and the lay members bring a wide range of business, commercial and public sector experience.

The current members of the Board are:
Lynne Berry OBE (Chair)
Amanda Gibbon
Bill Horne
Dr Lorna Williamson OBE
Dr Stuart Dollow
Glenn Houston
Hossam Abdalla
Professor Andy Hall
Professor Anthony Warrens
Professor Penney Lewis
The Right Reverend Graham Usher
Dr Charmaine Griffiths
Professor Gary Crowe

References

External links
Human Tissue Authority
Announcement of membership - Page at the Wellcome Trust announcing the Human Tissue Authority members.
Chafea Transplantation and Transfusion brochure - Outlining around 50 EU-funded Projects and Actions for saving and improving the quality of life of citizens by facilitating transplantation and blood transfusion in the European Union. Produced by Chafea - the Consumers, Health, Agriculture and Food Executive Agency.

Department of Health and Social Care
Health in the City of Westminster
Legal aspects of death
Medical and health organisations based in the United Kingdom
Medical education in the United Kingdom
Medical regulation in the United Kingdom
Medical research organizations
Non-departmental public bodies of the United Kingdom government
Organ transplantation in the United Kingdom
Organisations based in the City of Westminster
Organizations established in 2005
Transplant organizations
2005 establishments in the United Kingdom